Karimabad (also Romanized as Karīmābād) is a village in Ordughesh Rural District, Zeberkhan District, Nishapur County, Razavi Khorasan Province, Iran. At the time of the 2006 census, its population was 182, in 43 families.

References 

Populated places in Nishapur County